Shiki-Tei (四季庭, which translates as "Four Seasons Garden") is a downloadable gardening simulator for the PlayStation 3 .

Gameplay
This life simulation game's purpose is to create and maintain a Japanese garden. It has a Photo Mode which allows the player to take in-game screenshots and to share them with players in the online gallery. Custom soundtrack feature is also enabled.

There is a wild life pack with several animals such as a red fox, a chipmunk or a red-crowned crane. Mainichi Issho's Toro is also featured.

See also
Mainichi Issho
Afrika
Aquanaut's Holiday: Hidden Memories

Notes

External links
Official website

2008 video games
PlayStation 3-only games
PlayStation Network games
Sony Interactive Entertainment games
Japan-exclusive video games
PlayStation 3 games
Video games developed in Japan
Video games scored by Yoshino Aoki